is a 2011 Japanese television drama series. A family grieving their mother's recent death hires Akari Mita as a housekeeper to upkeep the house, which has been thrown into disarray. Mita, who is played by actress Nanako Matsushima, will do anything that her employer orders her to do, except smiling or revealing her past.

This television series was broadcast from October 12 to December 21, 2011, as part of Nippon Television's Tears Wednesday time slot, which airs every Wednesday from 10:00 to 10:54 pm. I'm Mita, Your Housekeeper. garnered an average viewership rating of 25.2%. Its last episode garnered a  viewership rating of over 40% when it was aired, making it the highest watched show of 2011 in Japan.

I'm Mita, Your Housekeeper. won several awards, including "Best Drama" at the 71st Television Drama Academy Awards. Despite the popularity of I'm Mita, Your Housekeeper., its writer revealed that there will not be any sequels to the series.

Plot

The Asuda family—a father, Keiichi, and four children ranging in age from 5 to 16—are still grieving over the death of the mother, Nagiko. Through an agency, the father hires a new housekeeper to take charge of the housework. They get Mita, an impassive person who does her job impeccably, but speaks in monotones and completely suppresses her emotions. The agency owner warns the father to be careful about what family members ask Mita to do, because she will do anything that she is ordered to do, even going as far as to kill someone. The only thing she will not do is a task that requires her to smile or to speak about or reveal her past. During this period of time, the family becomes fragmented, as they each blame themselves for the mother's death. Mita helps guide the family through these problems, though she does not explicitly give them advice.

Eventually, the family manages to come to terms with their mother's death. They in turn help Mita to overcome her extremely traumatic past, because of which she cannot smile or speak her mind. Thanks to their constant care for her, Mita gradually starts to discover love again. However, Mita knows that she cannot become the stepmother of these children, and thus takes the drastic step of becoming a cruel and ultimately short-lived stepmother. In the end, Urara, the children's aunt, becomes their stepmother. Mita then reveals that she cannot work for them anymore, since she has found employment elsewhere. On Christmas Eve, the family finally managed to make Mita smile during their last dinner together. With the family having found their priorities in life, Mita leaves the family on Christmas Day to work for yet another household.

The characters include Urara, a kindly and well-intended woman who is the sister of the deceased mother but is also something of a klutz with a knack for showing up at inopportune moments and messing up, and Yoshiyuki Yūki, who is Urara's father, the children's grandfather, who holds his son-in-law responsible for his daughter Nagiko's death. His anger and frustration gradually dissipate over the course of the events of the series.  There is also a nosy and unpleasant neighbor who behaves in quite a cruel way to the Asudas, despite that fact that she has her own problems.

Cast

Harumi Housekeeping Agency

 Nanako Matsushima as 
 The housekeeper of the Asuda household. She does not smile, and is very efficient in carrying out her duties. Beneath her facade however, she have had the traumatic experience of losing all of the people that she had loved the most in her life. These people includes her father, husband and son. All of them had died under tragic circumstances. Because of this, she dare not start to love another person, for the fear that she might bring them ill-luck. Eventually, she starts to feel emotions again after the Asuda family's constant pestering for her to show her own feelings.

 Yumi Shirakawa as 

 She is the head of the housekeeper agency that Akari is from. In addition to that, Harumi also used to be the housekeeper for Mita's family, and therefore knows her the best. She hopes that Mita would eventually smile on her own free will. Harumi later shifted the housekeeping agency to Okinawa, bringing Mita along with her.

Asuda Household

 Hiroki Hasegawa as 
 He is the head of the Asuda household. However, he wanted to divorce his wife to marry Kazama, with whom he was having an affair. This led to his wife's suicide. After the children found out, he and his children fell apart, and were only reunited with Mita's help. This also led to him being sacked from his prestigious job as a section chief in a reputable company. On the other hand, after this incident, he realized that his children were very important part of him.

 Shiori Kutsuna as 
 The eldest child in the family. She is a second-year high school student, and is a member of her school's photography club. She blamed for being the cause of her mother's misery, because her parents were forced to marry due to the fact that Nagiko was pregnant with her. Yui nearly committed suicide after discovering that her boyfriend was actually toying with her. She even asked Mita to kill herself, though Mita was stopped in time. Yui later acted as a mother to the rest of the family, helping out with housework and making important decisions for them. Yui's name implies her role in the family - the role of being the one who bonds the family.

 Taishi Nakagawa as 
 The eldest son in the family. He is a student in a public junior high school, and the captain of the school's basketball team. He is also a hot-headed person, and always makes rash decisions. However, he is very protective of his family members. His name Kakeru symbolizes his role as the protector of the Asuda family.

 Shūto Ayabe as 
 The youngest son in the family. He is a sixth-grade student in elementary school, and is the class president of his class. Kaito aims to achieve high grades in order to enter a prestigious privately run junior high school. He has a calm personality, and is the one who comes up with solutions to solve the family's problems. Kaito's name is a pun, meaning that he will be "the one who finds answers to the family's problems".

 Miyu Honda as 
 The youngest member of the family. She is a very inquisitive girl, and always asks the question of "What is [that]?" whenever somebody uses a difficult word or phrase in front of her. The family decided to come and live together once again because of her suicidal threats. Kii's name comes from the term "key person", which reflects her role of being the key source of happiness in the family.

 Yūko Daike as 
 The now-deceased wife of Keiichi. She had committed suicide after Keiichi gave her a set of divorce papers to sign. Because of her suicide, the Asuda family was thrown into turmoil.

Yūki Household

 Saki Aibu as 
 She is the sister of Nagiko and a PE teacher at Yui's high school. Urara is always doomed with bad luck, and everything she undertakes in good faith ends in failure. Despite that, she has a cheery personality and always wears a smile on her face. She later confessed her love for Keiichi, though knowing that the love was ill-fated, she married someone whom she had met at a marriage meeting. However, thanks to Mita, the Asuda family realized that she was an important member of the family, and she actually wards off the family's bad luck. In the end, the Asuda family choose Urara over Mita to be their mother (which was Mita's plan) and removed Urara from her wedding ceremony. Urara agreed that she will not marry Keiichi, though she will still be the family's "mother".

 Sei Hiraizumi as 
 Keiichi's stubborn father-in-law and a school principal. He disapproves of Keiichi after his shotgun marriage to Nagiko, believing that his daughter was seduced by him. He nearly adopted the Asuda children against their wishes, believing that he can do a better job raising them than Keiichi. However, he soften his attitude towards the family after Mita pretended to be Nagiko's ghost at the Asuda family's orders. Although he eventually uncovered the hoax, he was very touched by Mita's account. Towards the end of the show, he becomes a doting grandfather towards the Asuda children.

Mita Household

 Yuu Kamio as 
 Mita's deceased husband. Naoya was a successful doctor, and was 37 years old when he died. He had died in a fire that Mita's half-brother had started due to a dispute.

 Kanata Fujimoto as  
 Mita's deceased son. Jun had died in the fire that had also claimed the life of his father. Mita is constantly haunted by his pleas for help he had made before he got burned to death.

 Miyoko Akaza as Mita's mother-in-law
 She constantly blames Mita for Naoya's death, saying that her smile brought bad luck to her loved ones. She also ordered Mita to not smile again to show that she was truly remorseful for Naoya's death.

 Kei Sunaga as Mita's father-in-law
 He also blames Mita for the death of his son.

Minakawa Household

 Hitomi Sato as  
 The neighbor of the Asuda household. She disapproves of the Asuda household because they have no mother. She is extremely protective of her son Tsubasa, and is also concerned about his studies. However, when she discovered that her own husband was having an affair behind her back she ordered Mita (who was at that time their housekeeper) to kill the whole family. She was chased out of the house after her plan was uncovered.

 Ryūga Nakanishi as  
 The son of Mariko and Kii's classmate. He was the one that revealed that his father was having an affair.

 Masanori Ikeda as  
 Mariko's husband. He revealed that he regretted marrying Mariko, and had a secret affair behind her back.

Others

 Maho Nonami as Mie Kazama, Keiichi's coworker
 Syuusuke Saito as Takuya Ozawa, Yui's senior in school. He was also once Yui's boyfriend.

Production

I'm Mita, Your Housekeeper. was first announced on August 12, 2011. It was announced that Nanako Matsushima will be the lead actress in the series. This is her first role in a television drama series after a two-year hiatus.

Nanako said that she was familiar with the writer of I'm Mita, Your Housekeeper., since they had collaborated on drama series like Great Teacher Onizuka and Majo no Jōken (which are Nanako's signature works), though this was the first time they had collaborated on a family drama. She added that she was "happy to challenge a new genre."

Broadcast

I'm Mita, Your Housekeeper. was aired in Nippon TV's Tears Wednesday drama time slot, which is aired every Wednesday, 10:00 to 10:54 pm. Due to the popularity of this series, episodes 9, 10, and 11 all had an extended broadcast. Before the final episode of the series was shown, an hour-long special program featuring special behind-the-scenes footage of I'm Mita, Your Housekeeper. was broadcast.

Writer Kazuhiko Yukawa announced that there will be no sequels to this series, despite its popularity. He said that he wanted "to leave [the remainder] to the viewers' imaginations."

Episodes

Reception

I'm Mita, Your Housekeeper. was extremely well received by Japanese television viewers. It garnered an average viewership rating of 25.17%, the highest of any 2011 Japanese television dramas. In addition, the Mita effect is attributed as one of the main factors that allowed broadcaster Nippon Television to become the top broadcaster in Japan in 2011, beating the previous record-holder Fuji Television.

In particular, its last episode achieved the highest viewership rating of 40.0%. At one point in the broadcast, the viewership ratings hit 42.8% in the Kantō region. This makes this episode the second-most watched Japanese television program of 2011, after the 62nd NHK Kōhaku Uta Gassen. The episode also ranks as the third-most viewed in the history of Japanese television dramas, excluding NHK's "Asadora" and "Taiga" dramas. Oricon noted that previously, viewership ratings of 30% were considered as the norm, but in modern days, viewership ratings of 40% can be considered "divine". Additionally, this episode achieved viewership ratings of 36.4% and 34.6% in the Kansai region and Nagoya respectively.

Awards

Theme song

The theme song for I'm Mita, Your Housekeeper. is "Yasashiku Naritai" by Kazuyoshi Saito. This was revealed in an announcement made on September 29, 2011. "Yasashiku Naritai" was the first song Kazuyoshi provided for a Japanese television drama since the 2009 NHK drama Limit: Keiji no Genba 2. Main leads from I'm Mita, Your Housekeeper. were also featured in the song's music video.

The song later became Kazuyoshi's 39th single, released in Japan by Victor Entertainment on November 2, 2011. The single debuted at the 6th position on the Oricon Singles Chart, with its sales boosted by the good reception of Kaseifu no Mita. It sold 70 thousand copies by December 27, 2011. A number that grew to over 2.5 million physical and digital copies by 2013, making it one of the best-selling singles in Japan. "Yasashiku Naritai" won "Best Theme Song" at the 71st Television Drama Academy Awards.

Remake

A South Korean remake titled The Suspicious Housekeeper starring Choi Ji-woo and Lee Sung-jae was produced in 2013.

References

External links

  
  

2011 Japanese television series debuts
2011 Japanese television series endings
Japanese drama television series
Nippon TV dramas
Television shows written by Kazuhiko Yukawa